{{DISPLAYTITLE:C11H16N4O4}}
The molecular formula C11H16N4O4 (molar mass: 268.27 g/mol, exact mass: 268.1172 u) may refer to:

 Acetylcarnosine (NAC)
 Dexrazoxane
 Pentostatin

Molecular formulas